Skol Adrien Cycling Academy is a Rwandan professional road bicycle racing team. The team was established in 2020 with UCI Continental status by former cyclist Adrien Niyonshuti to help develop young Rwandan cyclists.

Team roster

References

External links

Cycling teams established in 2020
UCI Continental Teams (Africa)
Cycling teams based in Rwanda